William P. Carleton (October 3, 1872 – April 6, 1947) was a silent film actor who appeared in 40 films between 1919 and 1944. He is sometimes billed as William Carleton Jr.. Carleton was born in London and was briefly married to actress Toby Claude; they divorced in 1903. He was a distant cousin of Sir Guy Standing and other Standing acting family members.

On April 6, 1947, Carleton died in Hollywood, California, as a result of injuries from an automobile accident. He was 74.

Partial filmography

 The Spark Divine (1919) - (billed as William Carleton, Jr.)
 A Society Exile (1919) - Sir Ralph Newell
 The Copperhead (1920) - Lieutenant Tom Hardy
 The Amateur Wife (1920) - Cosmo Spotiswood
 His House in Order (1920) - Minor Role
 The Flapper (1920) - Richard Channing
 The Riddle: Woman (1920) - Eric Helsingor
 The Inside of the Cup (1921) - John Hodder
 Good Women (1921) - Sir Richard Egglethorpe
 Straight from Paris (1921) - John Van Austen
 Behind Masks (1921) - Major Nigel Forrest
 A Wife's Awakening (1921) - Howard
 What No Man Knows (1921) - Drake Blackly
 Morals (1921) - Sir Marcus Ordeyne
 The Law and the Woman (1922) - Julian Rolfe
 Bobbed Hair (1922) - Paul Lamont
 The Worldly Madonna (1922) - John McBride
 Domestic Relations (1922) - Judge James Benton
 Our Leading Citizen (1922) - Oglesby Fendle, capitalist
 The Danger Point (1922) - James Benton
 The Truth About Wives (1923) - Alfred Emerson
 The Tie That Binds (1923) - Daniel Kenyon
 Sinner or Saint (1923) - Paul Reynolds
 Homeward Bound (1923) - Rodney
 Half-A-Dollar-Bill (1924) - Captain Duncan McTeague
 Charlie Chan's Chance (1932) - (uncredited)
 Ann Vickers (1933) - Minor Role (uncredited)
 Girl Without a Room (1933) - Academy Judge (uncredited)
 Rendezvous at Midnight (1935) - Judge
 The Perfect Clue (1935) - Jerome Stewart
 Les Misérables (1935) - First Judge in Arras (uncredited)
 Two Sinners (1935) - Heggie
 Bad Boy (1935) - Col. Good (uncredited)
 The Adventures of Frank Merriwell (1936, Serial) - Charles Merriwell [Chs.10-12]
 The Bohemian Girl (1936) - Count Arnheim
 The Return of Jimmy Valentine (1936) - Warden Keeley
 The Border Patrolman (1936) - Jeremiah Huntley
 Mystery Plane (1939) - Navy Commander
 Boys' Reformatory (1939) - Judge Robert H. Scott
 The Green Hornet Strikes Again! (1940, Serial) - Gloria's Father (uncredited)
 Wilson (1944) - Senator (uncredited) (final film role)

References

External links

 
  William P. Carleton 1906 portrait (University of Washington, Sayre Collection)
 portrait(NY Public Library, Billy Rose collection)

1872 births
1947 deaths
Male actors from London
English male silent film actors
20th-century English male actors
20th-century British male actors